Hyaluronan synthase 3 is an enzyme that in humans is encoded by the HAS3 gene.

The protein encoded by this gene is involved in the synthesis of the unbranched glycosaminoglycan hyaluronan, or hyaluronic acid, which is a major constituent of the extracellular matrix. This gene is a member of the NODC/HAS gene family. Compared to the proteins encoded by other members of this gene family, this protein appears to be more of a regulator of hyaluronan synthesis. Two transcript variants encoding different isoforms have been found for this gene.

References

Further reading